Anthony "Tony" Moran is a DJ, record producer, remixer, singer and songwriter known for remixing popular songs. In 2007, he hit number one on the U.S. Billboard Hot Dance Club Play chart twice with "Walk Away" featuring Kristine W and "Keep Your Body Working" featuring Martha Wash. Moran also has a total of seven number one hits on the Billboard Dance Club Songs music charts in the United States and he has recently had four number one Billboard chart hits in the years 2016 and 2017.

As a remix producer, Moran has remixed work from top music artists including Michael Jackson, Madonna, George Michael, Mariah Carey, Whitney Houston, Cher, Selena Gomez and many others.

In December 2016, Billboard ranked him as the 92nd-most successful dance artist of all-time.

Early life, family and education
Moran was raised in Brownsville, Brooklyn, New York City, New York. He attended Brooklyn Technical High School.

Career
Moran began his career back in 1981, teaming with his friend Albert Cabrera as The Latin Rascals. Their edited versions of hit songs spliced together enjoyed major airplay on the New York City dance radio WKTU's mix show. The exposure led to a deal from Shakedown Studios which hired the duo to restructure popular hit radio songs into viable dance club hits. Shortly thereafter, they were contracted by Fever Records to write and produce a song for one of their new acts, the Cover Girls. The result was "Show Me", a song that became Moran's first top 40 gold record. It also helped to usher in the freestyle era of music. This opened the doors for new artists including TKA, Sa-Fire ("Boy, I've Been Told"), and Lisette Melendez ("Together Forever").

Moran continues to produce music and has produced some major hits played in dance clubs such as "Put Your Hands Up", "Cafe Con Alegria", and "The Promise". He also produced "Body to Body, Heart to Heart" for Cher's Living Proof album and was nominated for two Grammys for his production of Gloria Estefan's "Don't Let This Moment End" and "Heaven's What I Feel". Another major production was Donna Summer's "You're So Beautiful", which appeared on her greatest hits album entitled The Journey: The Very Best of Donna Summer. In December 2012, Moran also released another original production with the late Donna Summer entitled "Valley of the Moon" which was recorded at the same time as "You're So Beautiful".  TOUR

2017 Believe at Mexico

Discography

Albums
1991: Same Sun, Same Sky
2004: Tour De Beats
2005: Concept of One
2007: The Event
2011: Mix Magic Music
2017: Moodswings

Singles
2000: "Shine On" featuring Cindy Mizelle
2004: "The Promise" 
2004: "Live You All Over" presenting Deborah Cooper (#3 on Billboard chart)
2005: "Waiting for Alegria" with Ric Sena featuring Zhana Saunders (Top 5 on Billboard chart)
2007: "Everybody Dance (Clap Your Hands)" featuring Deborah Cox
2007: "Walk Away" featuring Kristine W. (#1 on Billboard chart)
2007: "Keep Your Body Working" featuring Martha Wash (#1 on Billboard chart)
2008: "Surrender Me" presenting Debby Holiday
2009: "You Are" featuring Frenchie Davis (top 5 on Billboard chart)
2010: "Destination" featuring Ultra Naté (#23 on Billboard chart)
2011: "Can I Love You More" featuring Trey Lorenz
2011: "Tenderness" featuring Deborah Cox
2011: "Magic" featuring Jennifer Holliday
2012: "If I Was Your Boyfriend" featuring Anastacia
2012: "Heart Beat" vs Deborah Cooper (#4 on Billboard chart)
2015: "I Like You" Tony Moran featuring Debby Holiday (Top 5 on Billboard chart)
2015: "Free People" featuring Martha Wash (#1 on Billboard chart)
2016: "So Happy" featuring Jason Walker (#1 on Billboard chart)
2016: "Say Yes" featuring Jason Walker (#1 on Billboard chart)
2017: "Lick Me Up" with Dani Toro featuring Zhana Roiya (#1 on Billboard chart)
2017: "My Fire" with Nile Rogers and featuring Kimberly Davis (#1 on Billboard chart)
2018: "You're Good for Me" featuring Kimberly Davis (#2 on Billboard chart)
2018: "I'm in Love with You" featuring Jason Walker (#1 on Billboard chart)

Remixography
1992: "Billie Jean" by Michael Jackson
1995: "Everlasting Love" by Gloria Estefan
1995: "Point of No Return" by Exposé
1996: "Chains" by Tina Arena
1996: "A Boy Like That" by Selena
1996: "I'm Not Giving You Up" by Gloria Estefan
1996: "It's All Coming Back To Me Now" by Céline Dion
1996: "No Frills Love" by Jennifer Holliday
1996: "For the Love of You" by Jordan Hill
1996: "I'd Really Love to See You Tonight" by Barry Manilow
1996: "Fastlove" by George Michael
1997: "Alane" by Wes Madiko
1997: "Step by Step" by Whitney Houston
1997: "Blood on the Dance Floor" by Michael Jackson
1997: "HIStory" by Michael Jackson
1997: "One More Time" by Real McCoy
1997: "Havana" by Kenny G
1997: "You Don't Know" by Cyndi Lauper
1997: "Together Again" by Janet Jackson
1997: "Like a Star" by Cynthia
1997: "Too Late, Too Soon" by Jon Secada
1998: "My Heart Will Go On" by Celine Dion
1998: "Oye!" by Gloria Estefan
1998: "Somewhere Tonight" by Lisa Frazier
1999: "Dov'è L'Amore" by Cher
1999: "Don't Stop" by Gloria Estefan
1999: "To Love You More" by Celine Dion
1999: "One for Sorrow" by Steps
2002: "Emotions" by Elle Patrice
2002: "Rising" by Elle Patrice
2002: "How Many" by Taylor Dayne
2003: "Walk On By" by Cyndi Lauper
2003: "Real Love" by Deborah Cooper
2003: "You're So Beautiful" by Donna Summer
2004: "Easy As Life" by Deborah Cox
2004: "R&B Junkie" by Janet Jackson
2004: "If I Close My Eyes" by Reina
2004: "Give It Up" by Kevin Aviance
2004: "The Promise" by Tony Moran
2004: "I'll Be Your Light" by Kristine W.
2004: "Cha Cha Heels" by Rosabel featuring Jeanie Tracy
2004: "Sanctuary" by Origene
2005: "The Wings" by Gustavo Santaolalla
2005: "We Belong Together" by Mariah Carey
2005: "Don't Forget About Us" by Mariah Carey
2005: "Into the West" by Annie Lennox
2005: "House Is Not a Home" by Deborah Cox
2005: "Movin' Up 2005" by Inaya Day
2006: "It Makes a Difference" by Kim English
2006: "Relax, Take It Easy" by Mika
2006: "Call on Me" by Janet Jackson
2006: "Get Together" by Madonna
2006: "Unfaithful" by Rihanna
2006: "About Us" by Brooke Hogan
2007: "Live Luv Dance" by Ron Perkov
2007: "Step into the Light" by Darren Hayes, singer of Australian Duo Savage Garden
2007: "It's My Life" by S Blush
2007: "Qué Hiciste" by Jennifer Lopez
2007: "I Got a Feelin'" by Vicki Shepard
2008: "Take a Bow" by Rihanna
2008: "I Get Off" by Ron Perkov
2008: "Turn It Up" by Basstoy featuring Dana Divine
2008: "The Flame 2008" by Erin Hamilton
2008: "Bring the Love" by Nicki Richards
2008: "I'm That Chick" by Mariah Carey
2009: "Miss You" by Ron Perkov
2009: "Crazy Possessive" by Kaci Battaglia
2009: "Body Rock" by Oceana
2009: "The Power of Music" by Kristine W
2009: "Come Back to Me" by Utada
2009: "Russian Roulette" by Rihanna
2010: "Strobelight" by Kimberley Locke
2010: "Beautiful Monster" by Ne-Yo
2010: "Destination" featuring Ultra Naté
2011: "Who Says" by Selena Gomez & The Scene
2011: "Can I Love You More" featuring Trey Lorenz
2012: "I Who Have Nothing" by Gladys Knight
2012: "Every Breath" by Inaya Day
2012: "Lay Your Hands" by Nicki Richards
2012: "Let Me Live Again" by Colton Ford
2012: "Valley of the Moon" by Donna Summer
2013: "Take It Like a Man" by Cher
2014: "I'm Not Coming Down" by Martha Wash
2014: "Stay for Awhile" by Amy Grant
2014: "Look My Way" by Colton Ford
2015: "I Love You More" by KC and the Sunshine Band
2016: "I'm Feeling You" by KC and the Sunshine Band featuring Bimbo Jones
2016: "Everything Happens for a Reason / Una Ragione" by Michéal Castaldo 
2016: "The Girl from Ipanema" by Ana Paula featuring Deborah Cox
2017: "Show Me Love" by Justin Michael Crum
2017: "All The Man That I Need" by Deborah Cox from The Bodyguard musical
2017: "Let the World Be Ours Tonight" by Deborah Cox
2017: "Waving Through a Window" by Ben Platt from the musical Dear Evan Hansen
2017: "Believe" by Crystal Waters

References

External links

American male songwriters
Record producers from New York (state)
Songwriters from New York (state)
American DJs
Club DJs
Gay composers
Gay singers
Gay songwriters
American gay musicians
American LGBT singers
American LGBT songwriters
Living people
Remixers
LGBT DJs
LGBT record producers
Year of birth missing (living people)
Electronic dance music DJs
20th-century LGBT people
21st-century LGBT people